Foundations of Modern Arab Identity (Gainesville, Florida: University Press of Florida, 2004) is a book by Arab American scholar Stephen Sheehi.

Published in 2004,  Foundations of Modern Arab Identity is a trail-blazing study of the Arab Renaissance or al-Nahda, critically engaging the  " intellectual struggles that ensued when Arab writers internalized Western ways of defining themselves and their societies a century and a half ago." Eminent scholar of the Middle East, Orit Bashkin states that "Sheehi’s work is an innovative and important contribution to the field of Arabic literature, Arab culture, and intellectual history" is noted for its  "imaginative outlook on the ways in which we read the texts that make up the canon of the Arab nahda," otherwise known as the Arabic Renaissance. Bashkin adds that " Sheehi's selection of texts is unique and original. Instead of focusing on either works in social thought or narrative prose, the book studies a variety of texts - pamphlets, newspaper articles, and philosophical tracts as well as maqamat, novels, and sketches - in an attempt to explicate new conversations and ideas, which were articulated in different genres and linguistic modes."

Among the  first of a wave of scholars to apply post-colonial and post-structural theory, most notably the theory of Jacques Lacan, Jacques Derrida, and Homi Bhabha, to a decolonial and marxist re-examination modern Arab culture and Arabic literature, the book  discusses major Arab intellectuals of the 19th century including Butrus al-Bustani, Salim al-Bustani, Jurji Zaydan, Farah Antun, Ahmad Faris Shidyaq, Nasif al-Yaziji, Muhammad al-Muwaylihi, Muhammad Abduh and others including Jamal ad-din al-Afghani. Anthropologist Lucia Volk writes that Sheehi proves that these intellectual "elites actively produced indigenous ideologies of modernity while struggling against the overwhelming powers of Western colonialism."

Foundations of Modern Arab Identity is a cornerstone for Nahdah Studies, critically re-examining the intersection of European colonialism and the creation of Arab modernity. Reframing the conception of modern Arab identity from a confrontation between two undifferentiated cultures, the book closely reads "foundational" Arabic texts from turn of the century
to demonstrate that the ideology  and discourses of Arab subjectivity were internally formed within the Ottoman Empire at a time of radical transformations in governance and political economy. Sheehi locates the battle for "self" and "other" outside of the "colonial encounter" between Western colonizer and Eastern colonized. Instead, the dialectic between Self and Other
transpired internally—epistemologically and discursively—on a plane of dynamic cultural and social formations within Ottoman Arab society and polity during the Tanzimat. A groundbreaking work of decolonial theory within modern Arabic literature and thought, Sheehi proposes that the concept of cultural "failure" is inherent to the ways modern Arab intellectuals critically reorganized and redefined Arab subjectivity during modernity. Examining a host of varying sources including Arab fiction and commentary from the Arab Press, Sheehi maps out a "formula" for Arab reform during 19th and 20th century al-nahda, which predicates "progress and civilization" as "proleptic" teleological endpoints. Linguistically and semiotically structuring this formula was an axiomatic "nomenclature of reform" that was found in all Arab reform writing and thought despite the ideological, sectarian, political, or national position of the author. This commonality, Sheehi reveals, is due to that historical and political fact that all reform paradigms during the late Ottoman and Mandate periods arose from a fundamental  epistemology of Arab modernity; a hybridized but still thorough modern form of modernity that Sheehi states was "autogenetic."

As this epistemology is based on priorities of indigenous and colonialist capitalist development and Western political hegemony, recast in the form of liberalism and Western cultural and superiority, intellectual paradigms, political programs, and visions of new national social order among Arab thinkers inevitably always express "lack" as the core of Arab identity because it is engaged in an endless struggle of authority and "subjective presence" with the West, who otherwise accuses Arabs as being inherently "backwards". This condition of failure is written into Arab subjectivity by Arabs themselves, internalizing racist notions of Arab otherness that accompany the "modern", humanist, Enlightenment project. Hence, what is self-diagnosed as "the inherent failure of Arab culture and "identity" is not proof of the inability of the Arab world to enter into modernity but in fact is precisely a condition of it. Hence, Foundations of Modern Arab Identity reveals that a "spectral European presence" is ever present in Arab modernity and its paradigms of Arab identity.

References

External links
 
 Stephen Sheehi, "Foundations of Modern Arab Identity" 
 

2004 non-fiction books
Arab
History books about the Middle East
Arab history